Gem County is a county in the U.S. state of Idaho. As of the 2010 census, the population was 16,719. The county seat and largest city is Emmett.

Gem County is part of the Boise, ID Metropolitan Statistical Area.

Gem County is home to the Idaho ground squirrel.

History
Named for the state nickname, "Gem State," the county was established on March 15, 1915, partitioned from Canyon County and Boise County. Fur trappers were in the area as early as 1818, and Alexander Ross explored Squaw Creek in 1824. Prospectors and miners moved through the county in 1862 en route to the gold rush in the Boise Basin around Idaho City, and by the next year irrigation began along the Payette River.  Under Washington Territory, the area was part of Idaho County from the time of settlement until the territory south of the Payette River became part of Boise County at its creation in 1863.  Picket's Corral, northeast of Emmett was the base of operations for a gang of horse thieves and "bogus dust peddlers" between 1862 and 1864. The Payette Vigilance Committee eliminated the gang, bringing safety for citizens of the area.  The act creating Ada County in 1864 established the Ada County boundary common to Boise County as a line from Grimes Creek to Picket's Corral and then north from that point to the existing northern boundary of Boise County, leaving the areas outside of Emmett within Boise County. Jonathan Smith and Nathaniel Martin settled near Emmett about 1862.  They established a ferry on the Payette River at Emmett in 1866.  On May 31, 1867, a post office was established at the ferry and named Martinsville, which was renamed Emmettsville on October 31, 1868; postal officials shortened the name of the post office to Emmett in 1885.

Census data for the area shows Squaw Creek Precinct under Boise County with a population of 30 in 1870.  Ada County did not separately return precincts at that census.  By 1890, Squaw Creek was split into two precincts.  Those precincts were grouped with Horseshoe Bend at the 1890 census.  The Emmett precinct contained 479 residents at that time.  The Emmett area was transferred to Canyon County at its establishment in 1892.  At the 1910 Census, three Emmett area precincts contained a population of 2,601 while three Boise County precincts of Upper Squaw Creek, Lower Squaw Creek, and Pearl contained 1,069 residents.

The Black Canyon Diversion Dam on the river was built in the early 1920s, east of Emmett.
Based on a german television broadcast, there was even in the 1990s a high level of Radioactivity because of the Atomic Tests in Nevada.

Geography
It is the fifth-smallest county in Idaho by area.

Adjacent counties
 Washington County - northwest
 Adams County - north
 Valley County - northeast
 Boise County - east
 Ada County - south
 Canyon County - southwest
 Payette County - west

National protected area
 Boise National Forest (part)

Demographics

2000 census
As of the census of 2000, there were 15,181 people, 5,539 households, and 4,176 families living in the county. There were 5,888 housing units at an average density of 10 per square mile (4/km2). The racial makeup of the county was 93.79% White, 0.73% Native American, 0.36% Asian, 0.07% Black or African American, 0.06% Pacific Islander, 3.16% from other races, and 1.83% from two or more races.  6.92% of the population were Hispanic or Latino of any race. 18.9% were of American, 17.5% German, 13.1% English and 7.2% Irish ancestry.

There were 5,539 households, out of which 34.00% had children under the age of 18 living with them, 63.40% were married couples living together, 8.40% had a female householder with no husband present, and 24.60% were non-families. 20.80% of all households were made up of individuals, and 9.90% had someone living alone who was 65 years of age or older.  The average household size was 2.70 and the average family size was 3.12.

In the county, the population was spread out, with 28.00% under the age of 18, 7.60% from 18 to 24, 25.30% from 25 to 44, 23.50% from 45 to 64, and 15.60% who were 65 years of age or older.  The median age was 38 years. For every 100 females, there were 98.70 males.  For every 100 females age 18 and over, there were 96.70 males.

The median income for a household in the county was $34,460, and the median income for a family was $40,195. Males had a median income of $31,036 versus $20,755 for females. The per capita income for the county was $15,340.  About 11.60% of families and 13.10% of the population were below the poverty line, including 15.60% of those under age 18 and 13.90% of those age 65 or over.

2010 census
As of the 2010 United States Census, there were 16,719 people, 6,495 households, and 4,611 families living in the county. The racial makeup of the county was 93.4% white, 0.6% American Indian, 0.5% Asian, 0.1% Pacific islander, 0.1% black or African American, 3.1% from other races, and 2.2% from two or more races. Those of Hispanic or Latino origin made up 8.0% of the population. In terms of ancestry, 23.2% were German, 19.2% were English, 15.8% were American, and 12.3% were Irish.

Of the 6,495 households, 30.6% had children under the age of 18 living with them, 56.9% were married couples living together, 9.3% had a female householder with no husband present, 29.0% were non-families, and 24.3% of all households were made up of individuals. The average household size was 2.55 and the average family size was 3.01. The median age was 42.9 years.

The median income for a household in the county was $42,794 and the median income for a family was $49,976. Males had a median income of $39,482 versus $31,083 for females. The per capita income for the county was $20,431. About 9.7% of families and 14.7% of the population were below the poverty line, including 17.3% of those under age 18 and 9.3% of those age 65 or over.

2016
As of 2016 the largest self-reported ancestries/ethnicities in Gem County, Idaho were:

2020 census
Note: the US Census treats Hispanic/Latino as an ethnic category. This table excludes Latinos from the racial categories and assigns them to a separate category. Hispanics/Latinos can be of any race.

As of the 2020 United States census, there were 19,123 people, 6,683 households, and 4,585 families residing in the county.

Communities

City
Emmett

Census-designated place 

Letha

Unincorporated communities
Ola
Sweet

Politics
Gem County is almost always Republican, The last time a Democratic presidential candidate carried the county was in 1964 by Lyndon B. Johnson.

See also
National Register of Historic Places listings in Gem County, Idaho

References

External links
County website
County Parcel Map
History of Gem County
County profile on state website
Black Canyon Diversion Dam

 

 
Idaho counties
1915 establishments in Idaho
Populated places established in 1915
Boise metropolitan area